Orthocomotis herbaria is a species of moth of the family Tortricidae. It is found from Guatemala to Costa Rica. It has also been recorded from Bolivia.

References

Moths described in 1920
Orthocomotis